Mark O'Toole may refer to:

Mark O'Toole (musician) (born 1964), bassist with Frankie Goes to Hollywood
Mark O'Toole (bishop) (born 1963), Roman Catholic Bishop of Plymouth